Citronella may refer to:

 Cymbopogon, lemongrass, or citronella grass 
 Citronella oil,  insect-repelling essential oil 
 Citronella (genus), of trees and shrubs 
 "Citronella", a song by Aesop Rock from the 2007 album None Shall Pass

See also

 Citronellal, a component in the compounds that give citronella oil its distinctive lemon scent
 Citronellol, a natural chemical found in citronella oils
 Citronelle, Alabama, a city in the U.S.
 Lasius, a genus of formicine ants commonly known as citronella ants 
 Pelargonium 'citrosum', or citrosa geranium, a perennial subshrub with fragrant leaves